Ami Mali Hicks (1867–1954) was an American feminist, writer, and organizer. She wrote books on art instruction and criticism. Hicks was a longtime administrator for Free Acres, an independent, collectivized community in New Jersey. She worked with the Women’s Political Union and was a member of Heterodoxy, two radical organizations that challenged some of the more placid activism of women’s movements and suffragists.

Early life
Ami Mali Hicks was born in 1867 in Brooklyn, New York to Josephine (née Mali) and George C. Hicks. Her maternal grandfather Hypolite Mali, was the Belgian consul to New York from 1840 until his death in 1883. She attended Miss Whitcomb's School and took art classes, studying with William Merritt Chase and Robert Henri. She studied portraiture in Paris under the artist Charles Chaplin.

Career
Around 1889, Hicks returned to New York City and began working at the Baynes Mosaic-Tracery Company making designs for metalwork. Simultaneously she continued her studies at the School of Artist Artisans on West Twenty-third Street to learn wallpaper design and book-cover designing, also teaching metalwork at the school. In 1892, one of her stencil designs was chosen to adorn the frieze of the assembly room for the Woman's Building at the World's Columbian Exposition the following year. She sold wall paper designs and made metal tracery patterns for Tiffany Glass and Decorating Company, but found she was unable to financially support herself without taking on additional work as a director of art works at the Lotus Press and several other printing houses. She supervised the printing of menus, programs, cards and bookplates, as well as creating the designs to be printed. By 1903, she had expanded her classes and was teaching design at the Guild of Arts and Crafts for which she served as financial secretary. In 1906, Hicks and other artisans formed the National Society of Craftsmen and she was elected to serve a three-year term as a director on the board.

Hicks began to focus on batik and exhibited pieces at the Second Annual Exhibition of the National Arts Club in 1908, where her wall hanging was praised for her use of color. She began experimenting with dyes, often creating her own combinations to match decorations for home decor. In 1909, she joined with Bolton Hall, an ardent member of the Henry George Movement, to establish a single tax colony on a piece of farmland he owned. Hall converted the hen house to a dwelling for his private use and Hicks and Ella Murray made use of the dilapidated farm house. The goal of the colony was to establish a community for those who could not afford a summer home to share the property and work together for improvements. The group sent out invitations to other Georgists and by 1910, the three were joined by Grace Isabell Colburn, Otto G. Fischer and his wife, and Walter Hampton, who incorporated the property as Free Acres. Meeting in Hicks' studio, the group of seven drafted the incorporation papers, where members were allowed to build in the community but forbidden to buy or sell the land. Land rents were annually collected and the corporation paid the various taxes due. She was elected as one of the first trustees and continued to serve in that capacity throughout the 1930s, as well as participating in events of the Henry George School.

Though Hicks continued to produce batiks, she also made woven works, draperies, and produced watercolors influenced by Japanese styles. She began to publish books and articles on arts and crafts, including such works as "Batik, Its Making and Its Use" (House & Garden (November 1913), The Craft of Handmade Rugs (1914), Everyday Art (1925), and Color in Action (1937). In 1919, she joined the faculty of a theatrical school run by Yvette Guilbert and was responsible for teaching costume and scenery design. She became active in the women's suffrage movement, joining the militant Women's Political Union led by Harriet Stanton Blatch. Hicks was among the women who demanded that President Woodrow Wilson stop imprisoning suffragettes and was a member of the radical feminist group, the Heterodoxy Club. She spoke on single tax issues at feminist rallies, for groups like the Equal Franchise League and the Woman's Christian Temperance Union. In the 1940s, she retired to her property near "Free Acres" and in 1950, was one of only two of the original members still living.

Death and legacy
Hicks died in 1954. Free Acres, which she helped found, is still a thriving community.

References

Citations

Bibliography

 
 
 
 

 
 

 

 
 
 
 

 
 
 
 

1867 births
1954 deaths
Artists from Brooklyn
American women artists
American feminists
20th-century American women writers
20th-century American writers
American suffragists
Georgists